The Rookie Cop is a 1939 film directed by David Howard and starring Tim Holt as a rookie cop who wants to prove his friend wasn't involved with a robbery. The film also stars Virginia Weidler, Janet Shaw, Frank M. Thomas, and Muriel Evans.

Plot summary

Cast

Reception
The film made a profit of $18,000.

The Los Angeles Times called it "an unusually agreeable picture".

References

External links 
 
 
 
 

1939 films
1939 drama films
American black-and-white films
Films directed by David Howard
American drama films
Films produced by Bert Gilroy
1930s English-language films
1930s American films